The National Bar Association (NBA) was founded in 1925 and is the nation's oldest and largest national network of predominantly African-American attorneys and judges. It represents the interests of approximately 65,000 lawyers, judges, law professors, and law students. The NBA is organized around 23 substantive law sections, 9 divisions, 12 regions, and 80 affiliate chapters throughout the United States and around the world. The current and 75th president is Juan R. Thomas of Aurora, Illinois.

Structure and activities
The National Bar Association (NBA) is governed by a Board of Governors, mostly elected from the membership but also including NBA's officers and representatives of groups such as the NBA's Divisions.

The National Bar Association Young Lawyers Division, chaired by Khyla Craine, represents the new members of the legal profession, and membership is open to NBA members who have been admitted to practice for less than 10 years or are under 40 years old. The association has several affiliate chapters located throughout the United States, including The Cook County Bar Association, The Barristers' Association of Philadelphia, the California Association of Black Lawyers, the Washington Bar Association, the Virgil Hawkins Florida Chapter National Bar Association, the Garden State Bar Association and the Metropolitan Black Bar Association.

The National Bar Institute (NBI) is the philanthropic arm of the NBA, founded in 1982. The association has established an annual award in honor of the late Louisiana State Representative Pinkie C. Wilkerson of Grambling—the "Pinkie C. Wilkerson Outstanding State Legislator of the Year Award". The NBA offers a job listing service as well as advertising in its magazine to assist employers seeking to conduct affirmative action outreach toward minority job applicants.

History
The National Bar Association was established in 1925 as the "Negro Bar Association" after Gertrude Rush, George H. Woodson, S. Joe Brown, James B. Morris, and Charles P. Howard, Sr., were denied membership in the American Bar Association. The young Charles Hamilton Houston, future dean of Howard University Law School, also helped with the founding. 

Its first president was George H. Woodson of Des Moines, Iowa. Arnette Hubbard became the NBA's first female president in 1981.

In 1940, the NBA attempted to establish "free legal clinics in all cities with a colored population of 5,000 or more." Its members supported litigation that achieved a US Supreme Court ruling that defendants had to be provided with legal counsel.

In 2010, the NBA partnered with the U.S. Census Bureau to work toward a complete and accurate count of the nation's population through various outreach activities.

Affiliates

Alabama 
 Birmingham: Brazil Bar Association
 Montgomery: Alabama Lawyers Association

Arkansas 
 Little Rock: W. Harold Flowers Society

California 
 Los Angeles: Black Women Lawyers Association of Los Angeles
 Los Angeles: John M. Langston Bar Association
 Mill Valley: CA Association of Black Lawyers
 Oakland: Charles Houston Bar Association
 Sacramento: Wiley M. Manuel Bar Association
 San Diego: Earl B. Gilliam Bar Association
 Santa Clara: Black Women Lawyers Association of Northern CA

District of Columbia 
 Washington: Morocco
 Washington: Washington Bar Association
 Washington: GWAC

Delaware 
 Wilmington: Delaware Barristers Association

Florida 
 Apopka: Virgil Hawkins Florida Chapter

Georgia 
 Atlanta: Georgia Association of Black Women Attorneys
 Atlanta: Gate City Bar Association
 Carrollton

Illinois 
 Chicago: Cook County Bar Association

Indiana 
 Indianapolis: Marion County Bar Association

Kentucky 
 Lexington: John Rowe Chapter
 Louisville: Louisville Black Lawyers Association

Louisiana 
 Baton Rouge: Louis A. Martinet – Baton Rouge

Massachusetts 
 Boston: Mass. Black Lawyers Association

Maryland 
 Baltimore: Alliance of Black Women Attorneys
 Baltimore: Monumental City Bar Association
 Greenbelt: J. Franklyn Bourne Bar Association

Michigan 
 Detroit: Wolverine Bar Association
 Lansing: Davis-Dunning Affiliate Chapter
 Troy: D. Augustus Straker Bar Association

Minnesota 
 Minneapolis: Minnesota Association of Black Lawyers

Missouri 
 Kansas City: Jackson County Bar Association
 St. Louis: Mound City Bar Association

Mississippi 
 Jackson: Magnolia Bar Association

New Jersey 
 Trenton: Garden State Bar Association

New Mexico 
 Albuquerque: New Mexico Black Lawyers Association

Nevada 
 Las Vegas: Las Vegas Chapter

New York 
 New York: Metropolitan Black Bar Association
 New York: Association of Black Women Attorneys
 Rochester: Rochester Black Bar Association
 Wheatley Heights: Amistad Long Island Black Bar

Ohio 
 Cincinnati: Black Lawyers Association of Cincinnati
 Cleveland: Norman S. Minor Bar Association
 Columbus: John Mercer Langston Bar Association

Pennsylvania 
 Philadelphia: Barristers Association of Philadelphia

Tennessee 
 Memphis: Ben F. Jones Chapter
 Nashville: Napier-Looby Chapter

Texas 
 Austin: Austin Black Lawyers Association
 Dallas: J.L. Turner Legal Association
 Dallas: AA Lawyers of TX State Bar
 Fort Worth: L. Clifford Davis Legal Association
 Houston: Houston Lawyers Association

Virginia 
 Richmond: Old Dominion Bar Association

Washington 
 Seattle: Loren Miller Bar Association

See also
 Discrimination in bar exam
 Union Internationale des Avocats

References

External links
 Official page

 
American bar associations
African-American professional organizations
Organizations established in 1925
1925 establishments in the United States